A Handbook of the Cornish Language is a book written by Henry Jenner in 1904, being widely considered the first work concerning the Cornish revival.

References

External links

Cornish language